Sharon is a rural locality in the Bundaberg Region, Queensland, Australia.

Geography
The locality is bounded to the north and east by Splitters Creek and to the south by the Burnett River.

Sharon is approximately eight kilometres west of Bundaberg towards Gin Gin. The Sharon Gorge is a further four kilometres along the highway, and is home to a tranquil area with rainforests, ferns, palms and orchids.

The neighbourhood of Manoo is located in the south-western area of Sharon; it takes its name from the former Manoo railway station on the now closed Mount Perry railway line. The name Manoo is an Aboriginal word meaning clear straight track.

History 

The locality is named after the Sharon plain in Israel.

A Methodist Sunday School was established in 1882 by the Workman family which met on the verandah of the school until a church could be built. The Primitive Methodist church was officially opened on Sunday 29 March 1896 by Reverend William Powell and Reverend Tom Ellison. The church was used by the Primitive Methodists on three Sundays each month with the fourth Sunday being available to other denominations. Circa 1935, the church building was sold to the Anglican Church.

Tantitha Provisional School opened on 26 February 1883. In 1894 it became a state school and was renamed Sharon State School.

Erin Hill State School opened on 30 April 1917. It closed on 14 June 1957.

Circa 1935, the Anglican Church purchased the former Primitive Methodist Church building and commenced services in February 1935. St Stephen's Anglican church was dedicated on 30 April 1945 by Rural Dean Reverend N.C.C. Bertram. Its closure was approved in September 1991. The church was in Gin Gin Road roughly opposite the Sharon State School (approx ).

Heritage listings

Sharon has the following heritage listings:
 Splitters Creek Railway Bridge

Education
Sharon State School is a government primary (Prep-6) school for boys and girls at 18 Sharon School Road. In 2018, the school had an enrolment of 116 students with 10 teachers (8 full-time equivalent) and 8 non-teaching staff (5 full-time equivalent).

There are no secondary schools in Sharon. The nearest government secondary school is Bundaberg North State High School in Bundaberg North to the north-east.

Amenities 
Sharon Public Hall is at 1016 Gin Gin Road.

References

External links

 

Bundaberg Region
Localities in Queensland